Un tango dalla Russia is a 1965 Italian spy film directed by Cesare Canevari. It is a spoof of James Bond's From Russia with Love.

Cast
Dan Christian as Charles Duff, Agente 070
Britt Semand as Evelyn
Seyna Seyn	as Katya
Liv Ferrer
Gara Granda
Attilio Dottesio as Fred
Don Testal
Mark Tessier

External links
 

1965 films
1965 comedy films
1960s action comedy films
1960s spy comedy films
1960s parody films
1960s Italian-language films
Italian spy comedy films
Italian parody films
Films directed by Cesare Canevari
Parody films based on James Bond films
1960s Italian films